The Doughboys are a pair of islands near Cape Grim, the northwestern point of Tasmania, Australia. The two islands form part of the Trefoil Island Group.

In June 2021, the Tasmanian Department of Primary Industries, Parks, Water and Environment, after consultation with local Aboriginal groups, approved the dual naming of the island pair as Koindrim. The dual name is intended to be represented in maps and publications as Koindrim / The Doughboys. This followed the approval in March 2021, after similar consultation, of names for the two islands. The eastern island's new name is Kaninerwidic (pronounced (Ka_nina_widic), while the westernmost one is 
Karrernootong (pronounced Kara_nu_tong).

Fauna
The islands are part of the Hunter Island Group Important Bird Area.  Breeding seabird and shorebird species include short-tailed shearwater, fairy prion, common diving-petrel, Pacific gull, silver gull, sooty oystercatcher and pied oystercatcher. Reptiles include metallic skink.

Gallery

See also

 List of islands of Tasmania

References

Important Bird Areas of Tasmania
Islands of North West Tasmania